Kathleen Flores (February 7, 1955 – October 21, 2021) was an American rugby union player who was the head coach of the U.S. women's national team until January 2011 and the head coach of the Brown women's rugby team. Past coaching tenures include Bay Area Touring Side (BATS) Rugby Club, the SF FOG men and the Berkeley All Blues.  She played rugby from 1978 to 1998 for Florida State University, the Berkeley All Blues Women's Rugby Club and U.S. women's national team.  She started coaching for the Berkeley All Blues 1998 and had been head coach and administrator for the U.S. women's national team since 2003. She began coaching the women's rugby team at Brown University in the fall of 2013, following the retirement of Kerri Heffernan. During her time in Rhode Island, she also coached the Providence Women’s Rugby team. She was able to bring them to several division 2 championships.

Early years 
Flores was born in Philadelphia, Pennsylvania and called Tallahassee, Florida her hometown. She attended Monmouth Regional High School in New Jersey, where she played field hockey, basketball and ran track. During her undergraduate years at East Stroudsburg University of Pennsylvania, Flores played basketball (guard) and was on the track team (javelin). She earned a B.S. degree in physical education in 1977.  In 1997 Flores was inducted into the ESU hall of fame for her athletic excellence during her undergraduate years.

Discovering rugby 
In 1978 Flores started a masters program in exercise physiology at Florida State University where she discovered the Seminoles, FSU's Women's rugby team.  Drawing from her experience as a basketball and track athlete, Flores had the finesse and strength for rugby.  Flores played at Number Eight and scrum-half for the Seminoles and won a total of 4 National Championships.

National level play 
Flores toured throughout England and France with the first unofficial U.S. national team in 1986, known as WIVERN. The  U.S. Women's National Team made its first official international appearance at the Can-Am Rugby Tournament in 1987.  With Flores capped at no. 8 and captain the U.S. defeated Canada 22-3, for which Flores scored a try. The 1990 New Zealand Rugby Festival saw Flores and 8 of her USA teammates being named to the World XV side.

In 1991 the USA Rugby sanctioned  Women's National Team would compile a 7–1 record at the first Women's Rugby World Cup championship with Flores on the pitch as a No. 8.

Club level and coaching 
Flores moved to the San Francisco Bay Area in 1994, where she started playing for the Berkeley All Blues.  In 1998 Flores officially retired from playing rugby, and began a career in coaching as the Berkeley All Blues head coach. In 2007, she retired as head coach of the All Blues to focus on the national team. The Berkeley All Blues won a total of 15 National Championship titles with Flores playing a key role, either as a player or coach. Flores also coached the Cal Women's rugby team from 1998 to 2004.

Regional and national level and coaching 
Flores was the Pacific Coast Regional All-Star team head coach from 1995 to 2002.

In late 2002, USA Rugby announced Kathy Flores as the new head coach of the Women's National Team. The following year she was honored with the IRB International Women's Personality of the Year Award. “Kathy was given the Women’s Personality of the Year Award for her contribution to the game first as a player and then in her capacity as an administrator,” said IRB Communications Director Chris Rea. In 2007 Flores accepted a two-year extension of her contract as head coach.

Death
Flores died from colon cancer on October 21, 2021, at the age of 66 in Providence.

World Rugby Hall of Fame Induction 
Flores will be inducted into the World Rugby Hall of Fame in a special ceremony during the 2021 Rugby World Cup semi-finals at Eden Park on 5 November 2022.

Honors and awards
 2001 Flores was named Women's Sports Foundation's Coach of the Year 
 2003 International Rugby Board awarded her the Personality of the Year Award,
 She was an honorable mention for the list of the ten greatest North American rugby players.
 2014 USA Rugby Coach of the Year
 2016 U.S. Rugby Hall of Fame inductee
 2016 YWCA Woman of Achievement 
 Honored as a Pioneer of the Women's game in the RFU "Women's Rugby – A Work in Progress" 
 2017 U.S. Rugby Hall of Fame inductees: 1991 USA Eagles Women's World Cup squad member

References

External links

 USA Rugby Official Site
 Women's Eagles Unofficial Site
 Florida State University Women's Rugby
 Berkeley All Blues.
 Cal Women's college rugby team.
 Women's Rugby – A Work in Progress
 Brownbears.com

1955 births
2021 deaths
East Stroudsburg University of Pennsylvania alumni
Florida State University alumni
United States women's international rugby union players
Monmouth Regional High School alumni
Sportspeople from Monmouth County, New Jersey
American female rugby union players
21st-century American women